Emmaüs Mouvement: 1949–1999 Emmaüs a 50 ans is a compilation album for the 50th anniversary of the Emmaüs Mouvement, founded by Abbé Pierre in 1949.

Background and recording
After many encounters with Abbé Pierre, musician and producer Julien Civange proposed to add his contribution to the 50th anniversary of the Emmaüs Mouvement by gathering together on one album a number of different musicians who supported the idea behind the Emmaüs Mouvement — that is to say, the fight against all forms of exclusion. However, there was one condition — that every musician had to create a specific piece of music for the occasion or offer an as yet unpublished/unrecorded work.

Jean-Louis Aubert composed a very beautiful song "Veille sur moi", Stephan Eicher recorded a duet with the group Bratsch, Joe Strummer improvised a folk cover version of "Junco Partner", Linton Kwesi Johnson did a duet with Shurik'n and Imothep of the group IAM, Marianne Faithfull recorded the poems of Shakespeare, the group Les Rita Mitsouko recorded "Le Juste Prix", and Rachid Taha offered "54". Manu Chao, the groups "Air", Cassius, Mars IV, Les Négresses Vertes, and FFF, and Howie B also participated in the album.

The album was released on November 1999 through Virgin Records France.

Reception
To celebrate the event, the French media got involved in the promotion of the album, through speaking about it and offering space and airtime.  Also with the participation of FNAC, a launching concert was organised in FNAC Champs-Élysées, collecting together Jean-Louis Aubert, Stephane Eicher, and Linton Kwesi Johnson, who all performed in front of a packed-out audience whilst under the watchful eye of Abbé Pierre.

Raymond Depardon made the promotional film for the album.  Thanks to a competition by Steven Rubin, Fuji Laboratories, and the film director David Fincher (Seven, The Game) 450 reels of film were released throughout France and shown just before the movie Fight Club.

The album was well received by both the public and the press, and therefore achieved its goal: for Emmaüs Mouvement to touch a wide public particularly young people whilst celebrating its 50th anniversary through music.

Track listing

Personnel

 "Veille sur moi"
 Jean-Louis Aubert – bass, guitar, keyboards, vocals, lyrics and music
 Manu Katché – drums
 Le Baron guitar
 Dominique Blanc-Francard (DBF) – mixing
 Bénédicte Schmitt – recording
 "Tek Chance"
 Lyrics by Geoffroy Mussard, Linton Kwesi Johnson
 Music by Pascal Perez
 Linton Kwesi Johnson, Shurik'n and Imothep – performers
 Philippe Beneytout – recording and mixing
 "Tous les jours"
 Manu Chao lyrics, music, performer, recording, and co-production
 Renaud Letang – recording and co-production
 "Sonnet 14"
 William Shakespeare – writer
 Marianne Faithfull – performer
 "Le Juste Prix"
 Fred Chichin – guitar, music
 Catherine Ringer – keyboards, vocals, lyrics
 Dominique Blanc-Francard (DBF) – mixing
 Les Rita Mitsouko – performers
 Bénédicte Schmitt – mixing assistant
 Ayodele "Ski" Shekoni – programming and producer
 "Ceux à qui ça va bien" ("Dene wos guet geit")
 François Castellio – accordion
 Bratsch – arrangement
 Stephan Eicher – arrangement, vocals
 Ronan Le Bars – arrangement, bagpipes
 Nano Peylet – clarinet
 Pierre Jacquet – double bass
 Dan Gharibian – guitar
 Mani Matter – lyrics and music
 Pierre Geering – lyrics (translation)
 Bruno Girard – violin
 Pascal Colomb – recording
 Jeff Ginouves – recording assistant
 "Remember (Version Corde)" (strings version)
 Air performers
 David Whitaker – conductor, strings arrangement
 Lyrics by Jean-Benoît Dunckel, Jean-Jacques Perrey, and Nicolas Godin
 Music by Jean-Benoît Dunckel and Nicolas Godin
 Alex Gopher – mastering
 Stéphane "Alf" Briat – mixing
 "Amnésie internationale"
 FFF – performers, music
 Lyrics by Marco Prince and Marta Marugan
 Marta Marugan – vocals (Spanish voice)
 Yarol Poupaud – recording and mixing
 Freddy Martineau – recording assistant, mixing assistant
 "Junco Partner"
 Joe Strummer performer, arrangement
 "54"
 Rachid Taha – lyrics, music, and vocals
 Bruno Maman – acoustic guitar, bass, music
 Abdelouab Abrit Goblet – drums 
 Hassan Lachal – drum (derbouka)
 Steve Hillage – electric guitar
 Hakim Hamadouche – lute
 Rabah Mezouane – lyrics translation
 Frédéric Blanc-Garin – recording
 Antoine Gaillet – recording assistant 
 Pete Hofmann – mixing
 Barny – mixing assistant
 "Club 73"
 Cassius – performers
 Written by Boom Bass and Philippe Zdar
 "Ne reste pas seul"
 Mars IV writers, performers
 Pete Hofmann – mixing
 Greg Flemming – mixing assistant
 Programmed by James Bambury and Yul
 "Leaving Home"
 Howie B – performer and writer (as Howard Bernstein)
 "Bamboo Land"
 Bamboo Man – performer and writer (lyrics)
 Jean-Louis Aubert – featured performer and writer (music and lyrics)
 "Trabendo"
 Les Négresses Vertes – performers
 Written by Howie B, Iza Mellino, Jean-Marie Paulus, Matias Canavese, Michel Estrade, Ochowlack, Stéfane Mellino
 Howie B – producer and mixing
 Co-produceed by Jeremy Shaw and Will O'Donovan

 Julien Civange – executive producer
 Elise Luguern – executive producer assistant
 Mastered by – John Davis and Tim Young
 Virgin France – label and distributor
 Raymond Depardon – promo film
 Russ – artwork (front painting)
 Design by Antoine Leroux and Polux

References

External links

1999 albums